Eva Piñera Piñera (born July 1, 1974 in Gijón, Asturias) is a former backstroke swimmer from Spain, who competed at the 1996 Summer Olympics in Atlanta, Georgia for her native country. In the Georgia Tech Aquatic Center she finished in 20th place in the 100 m Backstroke, and in 15th position with the Women's Team in the 4x100 m Medley Relay.

References
 Spanish Olympic Committee

1974 births
Living people
Sportspeople from Gijón
Spanish female backstroke swimmers
Olympic swimmers of Spain
Swimmers at the 1996 Summer Olympics